KEVU-CD (channel 23) is a low-power, Class A television station in Eugene, Oregon, United States, affiliated with MyNetworkTV. It is owned by Cox Media Group alongside Fox affiliate KLSR-TV (channel 34). Both stations share studios on Chad Drive in Eugene, while KEVU-CD's transmitter is located on South Ridge.

Due to KEVU's low-power status, the station is simulcast on KLSR's second digital subchannel to expand its broadcasting radius. This signal broadcasts on channel 34.2 from the same transmitting tower on South Ridge.

In August 2019, then-owner California Oregon Broadcasting, Inc. upgraded KEVU-CD to the 1080i full HD picture format; prior to this upgrade, programming was being presented in 480i 4:3 SD. Concurrent with this upgrade, the full-market simulcast over KLSR-DT2 was upgraded to the 720p HD picture format; prior to that, the full-market simulcast of KEVU-CD over KLSR-DT2 was also being shown in 480i 4:3 SD.

History
The station signed on as independent station K25AS channel 25 on April 15, 1985. On October 9, 1986, the station affiliated with Fox. The station reverted to an independent when KEVU (channel 34, now KLSR-TV) signed on in 1991, taking the Fox affiliation from K25AS. On January 16, 1995, K25AS became a UPN affiliate. In 1997, the station's callsign was changed to KEVU-LP when channel 34 concurrently became KLSR. In 2002, the station became an independent for the third time when the UPN affiliation moved to KTVC (channel 36). KEVU-LP later became affiliated with MyNetworkTV when that network launched on September 5, 2006, and later changed its callsign to KEVU-CD in 2011. The station flash cut to digital in June 2010.

On February 24, 2022, it was announced that California Oregon Broadcasting, Inc. would sell KEVU-CD and KLSR-TV to Atlanta-based Cox Media Group for $7,222,000; the sale was completed on May 3.

Programming

Newscasts
In March 2014, KEVU started rebroadcasting some news programming of KPTV, Portland, Oregon. As of July 2015, it simulcasts the 8 a.m. program of Good Day Oregon (previously tape-delayed at 9 a.m.) on weekdays, the Saturday 6 a.m. half-hour and the Sunday 7 a.m. half-hour. It also tape delays the first half-hour of The 5 O'Clock News at 5:30 p.m. on weekdays and the first half-hour of The 10 O'Clock News at 11 p.m. every night.

Sports programming
KEVU-CD is the Eugene area over-the-air TV station for the Portland Timbers and the Portland Trail Blazers.

Technical information

Subchannels
The station's digital signal is multiplexed:

Translators

See also
 KLSR-TV

References

External links
 Bill Smullin: Southern Oregon TV's pioneer

MyNetworkTV affiliates
Dabl affiliates
EVU-CD
Television channels and stations established in 1985
1985 establishments in Oregon
Low-power television stations in the United States
Portland Timbers broadcasters
Major League Soccer over-the-air television broadcasters
Cox Media Group